Albert Victor Thompson (14 November 1886 – 13 January 1966) was a member of the Australian House of Representatives and the South Australian House of Assembly.

Born at Yatala (now Rosewater) near Port Adelaide, South Australia, Thompson was the sixth child of Joseph Thompson and Jane Ann Batey, both of Northumberland, England.  Thompson married Millicent Maud Garnaut on 19 January 1909 and initially farmed near Keith in southeast South Australia before a drought in 1914 led to their return to Port Adelaide.

In 1930 Thompson was elected President of the Carters and Drivers Union, (later the Transport Workers Union). His influence in the union movement led to his preselection as the Labor Party candidate for the safe Labor seat of Port Adelaide at the 1930 South Australian election. After the institution of single-member electorates in the South Australian House of Assembly in 1938, Thompson successfully transferred to Semaphore, serving there until 1946. He also served as president of the South Australian branch of the ALP from 1938 to 1940.

In 1946 Thompson resigned from state parliament to successfully run as the Labor candidate for the federal seat of Hindmarsh, based on Port Adelaide, in the House of Representatives. After most of the northern portion of Hindmarsh was transferred to the new seat of Port Adelaide ahead of the 1949 election, Thompson transferred there and won easily. Thompson retired from politics at the 1963 election.

References

Thompson, E. (1990), The History of Joseph and Jane Ann Thompson and their descendants 1850-1990, Lutheran Publishing House, Adelaide. 
 

1886 births
1973 deaths
Australian Labor Party members of the Parliament of Australia
Members of the Australian House of Representatives
Members of the Australian House of Representatives for Hindmarsh
Members of the Australian House of Representatives for Port Adelaide
Members of the South Australian House of Assembly
20th-century Australian politicians